C is the third letter in the Latin alphabet.

C or c may also refer to:

Computing
 C (programming language), developed at Bell Labs in 1972
 C, a hexadecimal digit
 C, a computable function, the set of all computable decision problems
 C:, or "Drive C", the default drive letter assignment for the default hard drive in DOS and Windows

Measurement
 °C, Celsius temperature scale
 Carat (purity)
 centi-, an SI prefix
 Coulomb, the SI derived unit for electric charge
 Cup (unit), a unit of volume

Science
 Troponin C, one of the three troponins
 Carbon, symbol C, a chemical element
 Atomic carbon or C
 ATC code C or cardiovascular system, a section of the Anatomical Therapeutic Chemical Classification System
 Haplogroup C (mtDNA), a human mitochondrial DNA (mtDNA) haplogroup
 Haplogroup C-M130 (Y-DNA), a Y-chromosomal DNA (Y-DNA) haplogroup once called simply C
 Cytosine, nucleic acid
 C (or Cys), an abbreviation for the amino acid cysteine
 C, a prefix for astronomical objects listed in the Caldwell catalogue, ranging from C1 to C109
 C, a prefix for astronomical star clusters, which follow the IAU's "Chhmm±ddd" format
 c, the speed of light in vacuum
 c, the speed of sound
 c, the specific heat capacity of a substance
 c, any constant
 C, capacitance
 C, symbol of coulomb
 Charm quark
 C-value, DNA contained within a haploid nucleus

Technology
 C battery, a size of battery
 Capacitor or C
 C battery, a type of battery for vacuum tube radios
 C or C-rate, a rate of charge and discharge of a battery

Mathematics
 C, a digit meaning twelve in hexadecimal and other positional numeral systems with a radix of 13 or greater
 C, the constant of integration
 C, in Roman numerals, the symbol for 100
 C, the set of continuous functions
 The combination or "choose" function
 c space, the space of all convergent sequences in functional analysis

Music
 C (musical note), and keys based on it:
 C major
 C minor
 C Album, an album by Kinki Kids
 C major chord, a chord in popular music
 , symbol used to designate common time
 , symbol used to designate alla breve
 "C", a composition by Francis Poulenc, one of Deux Poèmes de Louis Aragon

Literature

 C (novel), a novel by Tom McCarthy
 C, a 1924 novel by Maurice Baring
 C Magazine, a magazine published by Cardinal Courier Media
 "C" Is for Corpse, the third novel in Sue Grafton's "Alphabet mystery" series, published in 1986
 C-lehti ('C-magazine'), a defunct Finnish computer magazine

Transportation
 NZR C class (1873) train
 NZR C class (1930) train
 C, or 0-6-0 classification, a type of locomotive with three powered axles
C, the unofficial designation used by the U.S. Navy classification for Protected Cruisers and Peace Cruisers before the 1920 reclassification.
 C (Los Angeles Railway)
 C (New York City Subway service)
 C Line (Los Angeles Metro)
 Line C of the Buenos Aires Subte

Sport
 Captain (ice hockey)
 Catcher, a position in baseball
Center (basketball)
 Center (gridiron football)

Other uses
 Prefix "c", to specify a column number as in-source-locator in old citations
 С, a letter of the Cyrillic alphabet
 C (anime), by Tatsunoko Production, Fuji TV
 C (grade), a satisfactory grade in education
 C (plastic toy), a plastic toy from former Czechoslovakia
 Citigroup, Inc.'s stock ticker symbol
 Gaius or C
 Center Party (Sweden), a Swedish political party
 Mansfield Smith-Cumming or C (1859–1923), Chief of the SIS, the UK Secret Intelligence Service, also known as MI6
 His successors as Chief of the SIS have since been generally known by his alias, C
 C, also known as Max Denbigh, a character played by Andrew Scott in the film Spectre
 c (IPA) in the International Phonetic Alphabet (IPA), the voiceless palatal stop 
 Dominical letter C for a common year starting on Friday
 C, the production code for the 1964 Doctor Who serial The Edge of Destruction
 Charlie, the military time zone code for UTC+03:00
 c, alternative name for Grimes
 Farmall C, a tractor produced by International Harvester from 1948 to 1951
 C (restaurant), a restaurant in Tampere, Finland

See also

 
 C. (disambiguation)
 (C) (disambiguation), a parenthetical C
 C band (disambiguation)
 C-clamp, a type of fastener
 C class (disambiguation)
 Class C (disambiguation)
 c group (disambiguation)
 Group C (disambiguation)
 Line C (disambiguation) including "C line"; used in several public transport systems
 C series (disambiguation) including "Series C"
 Circle-c (disambiguation)
 C++, an object oriented programming language based on C
 C# (programming language), developed at Microsoft in 2001
 Cee (disambiguation)
 Cent (currency)
 Center (disambiguation)#Sports
 Cervical vertebrae
 Control-C, a keyboard control code
 Copyright symbol
 Objective-C, an object oriented programming language based on C, while available on various platforms, used mainly on OS X and iOS
 Sea (disambiguation)
 See (disambiguation)
 Vitamin C